This is a list of Sporting Clube de Cabinda players. Sporting de Cabinda is an Angolan football (soccer) club based in Cabinda, in the namesake province of Angola and plays at the Estádio Municipal do Tafe. The club was established in the year 1975.

2020-2021

2011-2020

2001-2010 
Sporting Clube de Cabinda players 2001–2010

1991-2000 
Sporting Clube de Cabinda players 1991–2000

External links
 Facebook profile

References

Sporting Cabinda
Sporting Clube de Cabinda players
Association football player non-biographical articles